The Folk Dance of Caucasus is one of the earliest Azerbaijani films produced and directed by the pioneer of Azerbaijani cinema, Alexander Mishon. It was released on August 2, 1898.

The film was shot on 35mm.

See also
List of Azerbaijani films: 1898-1919

References 
 The Oil Road: Journeys From The Caspian Sea To The City Of London page 9, books.google.com

1898 films
Azerbaijani silent films
Azerbaijani black-and-white films
1890s dance films
Films of the Russian Empire